Backblaze, Inc. is an American cloud storage and data backup company based in San Mateo, California. Founded in 2007 by Gleb Budman, Billy Ng, Nilay Patel, Brian Wilson, Tim Nufire, Damon Uyeda, and Casey Jones, its two main products are their B2 Cloud Storage and Computer Backup services, targeted at both business and personal markets.

History 
Backblaze was established in 2007 in San Mateo, California. In 2008, the company released online backup services to support PCs running Apple's macOS and Microsoft Windows.

In October 2021, Backblaze filed to go public on the Nasdaq under the symbol BLZE. In November, the company launched its public IPO.

Backblaze and Catalogic, a data protection vendor, announced their partnership in March 2022.

Products

Cloud backup
Backblaze's first product was its computer backup, offering users to back up their computer data continuously and automatically with a monthly subscription service. The service makes use of AES encryption for security, and uses data compression and bandwidth optimization to reduce upload and download times. Files that need to be restored can be delivered in the form of a digital download or on an external hard drive. File versioning and history is available with a 30-day cap or an additional cost per month.

Backblaze B2 Cloud Storage
In September 2015, Backblaze launched a new product, B2 Cloud Storage. Being an infrastructure as a service (IaaS), it is targeted at software integration for different kinds of businesses. It directly competes with similar services, such as Amazon S3, Microsoft Azure and Google Cloud. In April 2018, Backblaze announced cloud computing partnerships that directly connect Backblaze's data centers with its partners, Packet and ServerCentral.

In May 2020, Backblaze released an Amazon S3-compatible API, allowing customers to use existing tools and applications with B2 Cloud Storage without rewriting them. In May 2022, Backblaze released its cloud replication services, which allow customers to back up and store data in a location that is geographically separate from the data’s primary location.

Technology

Data centers
Backblaze has five data centers; four in the United States and one Europe. Two U.S. data centers are in Northern California near Sacramento, one is in Phoenix, Arizona, and in December 2022, Backblaze took residence in the CoreSite data center in Reston, Virginia. Backblaze's data center in the European Union is located in Amsterdam, Netherlands. In September 2022, Backblaze contracted 1MW of capacity at Nautilus's floating data center in Stockton, California.

Redundancy
In order to increase redundancy, data uploaded onto Backblaze's data center is sharded into 17 data pieces and three parity shards for each file. Parity shard bits are computed by the Reed–Solomon error correction algorithm. The shards are stored in 20 different drives, each in a separate cabinet to increase resilience to a power loss to an entire cabinet, or other physically based issue. Backblaze states that its 'Vault' architecture is designed with 99.999999999% annual durability.

Encryption
For Computer Backup, Backblaze uses a combination of AES and SSL encryption to protect user data. Data is stored in Backblaze storage using Reed-Solomon erasure coding and encrypted with the user's private key, which is secured with the user's password and username. The default encryption of private keys is done server side, which is unlikely to protect against government subpoena or serious data breach. Users desiring additional security and privacy can use the optional private encryption key (PEK), but the PEK passphrase is sent to the server when it is initially set, and must be sent again to restore any data.

Encryption for their B2 storage is handled entirely by the user and client software to manage the stored data, making it immune to government subpoena or data breach and protecting the data during transfer and ultimate storage in Backblaze's data centers.

Storage Pod open design

In 2009 and 2011, the company released CAD drawings of the computer case used by the storage servers in its datacenters. With commercial off-the-shelf components such as x64 processors, disks, and motherboards, high-density storage servers can be built at a lower cost than commercial ones. The company has since made six iterations of the design over the years.

References

External links
 Official website
 Forbes: Backblaze Undercuts All Cloud Storage Competitors (2015)
 The Register: Interview with Backblaze CEO Gleb Budman (2018)
 Fortune Magazine: Amazon, Google, and Microsoft Aren't the Only Cloud Innovators Around (2017)
 Review in The Sweet Setup (2017)
 Review in Macworld Magazine (2009) 
 Review in the Washington Post (2008)

Backup software
Web hosting
Cloud storage
File hosting for Windows
Online backup services
Companies listed on the Nasdaq
2021 initial public offerings
Software companies of the United States
Software companies established in 2007
American companies established in 2007
Companies based in San Mateo, California
Software companies based in the San Francisco Bay Area